The 2012 Albany Great Danes football team represented the University at Albany, SUNY in the 2012 NCAA Division I FCS football season. They were led by 40th year head coach Bob Ford and played their home games at University Field. They were a member of the Northeast Conference.

The 2012 season was the end of an era for Albany football. It was the Great Danes' final season as a member of the Northeast Conference as they will join the Colonial Athletic Association in 2013. It was also their final season at University Field, as they will begin CAA play at the new Bob Ford Field.

The Great Danes finished the season 9–2, 7–1 in NEC play to claim a share of the conference title with Wagner. Due to their head to head lost with Wagner, Albany did not receive the conference's automatic bid into the FCS playoffs and they did not receive an at-large bid.

Schedule

References

Albany
Albany Great Danes football seasons
Northeast Conference football champion seasons
Albany Great Danes football